Fasci Femminili (FF) ("Female Groups") was the women's section of the Italian Fascist Party (PNF). The FF was founded in 1919 and disbanded in 1945. It incorporated all the other Fascist organizations for women and girls, which were all formally sections of the FF.  

Its purpose was to instruct women in their role according to fascist ideology.   The FF met some hostility from male members of the party.  When it was formally created in 1920, having then informally excisted since 1919, it was almost unique, since other Italian political parties did not include women in their partiers.  It was reorganized to become a voluntary mass organization in 1929.   In practice, the majority of their work was charitable and social work, which was used to instruct women in the ideology of the party and to give the party good publicity. 

During the 1920s, the women active within the Fascist Party were mostly educated, middle-class women. Girls were included by the creation of youth groups for girls, separated by age class, such as the Piccole Italiane (for girls age 8–12) and the Giovani Italiane (13–18).   In 1925, the section Opera Nazionale Maternità ed Infanzia (OMNI) was created to support married mothers and children, which was essentially a charity organization managed by the FF-women.    The Massaie Rurali (MR) was founded in 1933 and the Sezione Operaie e Lavoranti a Domicilio (Section for Female Laborers and Home-workers or SOLD) in 1937, both intended to include rural and urban working-class women respectively within the PNF. The FF had 750.000 members in 1939. 

All these groups were formally sections of the FF.

References

Organizations established in 1919
Organizations disestablished in 1945
Italian Fascism
Women's organisations based in Italy